Di Giorgio Elementary School is a small public elementary school located in Arvin, California.

Its student body derives from portions of Arvin, California and from the unincorporated, rural Di Giorgio, California.

History
Two versions of the campus exist: an old, discontinued building alongside a basketball court, and the modern 33 acre campus. The two are right across the street from one another.

Prior to being named Di Giorgio, the campus consisting of the discontinued building (single room schoolhouse) carried the name of Rockpile School. Following the first years of operation, the school would close eight years after its opening due to low attendance rates. However, it would later open again. Enrollment would then "triple" during the 1930s.

Following the burning of the original schoolhouse, agricultural entrepreneur Joseph Di Giorgio would donate $150,000 dollars and 40 acres of land on Christmas Eve, 1945. Rockpile school would then change its name to Di Giorgio School to honor the gift.

Today, Di Giorgio Elementary School has an enrollment of approximately 220 students, taught by nine teachers, and supported by 22 staff members in total.

Air monitoring station
Controversy arose when the California Air Resources Board moved an air monitoring station to the school in November 2009, where, when compared with the original Bear Mountain site, had reportedly cleaner air. The original Bear Mountain monitor later shut down in late 2010, with the Di Giorgio school monitor becoming the board's sole monitor of Arvin's air.  The findings prompted the Committee for a Better Arvin to allow residents to take matters in their own hands and implement a "bucket-brigade" system, which will be placed around critical parts of Arvin, providing a more thorough analysis of Arvin's air quality.

References

Public elementary schools in California
Schools in Kern County, California
1897 establishments in California